LaMonte Aaron Wade Jr. (born January 1, 1994), nicknamed "Late Night LaMonte," is an American professional baseball first baseman and outfielder for the San Francisco Giants of Major League Baseball (MLB). He played college baseball for the University of Maryland, College Park. The Minnesota Twins selected Wade in the ninth round of the 2015 MLB draft. He previously played in MLB for the Twins, with whom he made his MLB debut in 2019.

Amateur career
Wade attended St. Paul's School in Brooklandville, Maryland. He played baseball and basketball. In baseball he played outfield and pitched. He was named to the All-Maryland Interscholastic Athletic Association team in 2010, 2011, and 2012, to the 2011 and 2012 Maryland State Association of Baseball Coaches Preseason All-State team, and to the 2011 Baltimore Sun All-Metro Second Team. He was also named to the 2012 Preseason Under Armour All-American Team and the 2012 Baltimore Sun All-Metro First Team, and was ranked the No. 1 prospect in the class of 2012 in Maryland by Dynamic Baseball.

He then attended the University of Maryland, College Park, where he played college baseball for the Maryland Terrapins. He played as a first baseman in his freshman year, but then became a center fielder. In 2015 he batted .335/.453 (2nd in the Big Ten Conference)/.468. For the Terrapins, Wade had a .394 on-base percentage in three seasons, walking more times than he struck out. In 2014, he played collegiate summer baseball with the Brewster Whitecaps of the Cape Cod Baseball League.

Professional career

Minnesota Twins (2015–20)
The Minnesota Twins selected Wade in the ninth round, with the 260th overall selection, of the 2015 MLB draft, and he signed for a signing bonus of $163,800. He made his professional debut with the Elizabethton Twins of the Rookie-level Appalachian League, batted .312/.428 (6th in the league)/.506 with a .934 OPS (7th) and 46 walks (2nd), 5 triples (3rd), 9 home runs (6th), 44 RBIs (4th), and 12 stolen bases (8th), and was an Appalachian League post-season All Star. He was promoted to the Cedar Rapids Kernels of the Class A Midwest League in the final week of the season. 

Wade began the 2016 season with Cedar Rapids. He started in the 2016 Midwest League All-Star Game. Following the All-Star Game, the Twins promoted Wade to the Fort Myers Miracle of the Class A-Advanced Florida State League. Wade finished 2016 batting .293/.402/.438 with eight home runs and 51 runs batted in (RBIs).  He was an MILB.com organization All Star.

Wade spent the 2017 season with the Chattanooga Lookouts of the Class AA Southern League, where he batted .292./.397 (10th in the league)/.408 with 74 runs (6th), seven home runs, and 67 RBIs (7th), while leading the league with 11 sacrifice flies, coming in second with five intentional walks, and drawing 76 walks (third in the league). He was a Southern League mid-season All Star. After the season, the Twins assigned Wade to the Surprise Saguaros of the Arizona Fall League.

Wade began the 2018 season in Chattanooga. He was a Southern League mid-season All Star. He was promoted to the Rochester Red Wings of the Class AAA International League in June. The Twins added Wade to their 40-man roster after the 2018 season. He opened the 2019 season back with Rochester.

On June 27, 2019, the Twins promoted Wade to the major leagues. He made his major league debut on June 28 versus the Chicago White Sox. In 2019 for the Twins he batted .196/.348/.375 with 10 runs, 2 home runs, and 5 RBIs in 56 at bats, playing primarily center field.

In 2020 for the Twins he batted .231/.318/.308 with three runs, no home runs, and one RBI in 39 at bats.

San Francisco Giants (2021–present)
On February 4, 2021, the Twins traded Wade to the San Francisco Giants for pitcher Shaun Anderson. Players and fans dubbed Wade "Late Night LaMonte" and "Late Inning LaMonte" due to his late-game heroics during the regular season.

In the 2021 regular season, Wade batted .253/.326/.482 with 18 home runs and 56 RBIs in 336 at bats, and six steals in seven attempts. Batting in games that were late and close, he hit .362/.444/.511, with 2 out and runners in scoring position he hit .407/.484/.889, and in the 9th inning he hit .565/.583/.826. He played 52 games in right field, 42 games in left field, 31 games at first base, and 2 games in center field. He won the 2021 Willie Mac Award as the team's most inspirational player.

In 2022, other than 58 at bats with AAA Sacramento in which he batted .250, with the Giants he batted .207/.305/.359 in 217 at bats, in which he had 29 runs, 8 home runs, and 26 RBIs. With the Giants he played 33 games in right field, 22 at first base, 19 in left field, 10 at DH, and one in center field.

On January 13, 2023, Wade agreed to a one-year, $1.375 million contract with the Giants, avoiding salary arbitration.

Personal life
Wade is from Owings Mills, Maryland. He has a brother, Jamal, who also played baseball for the Terrapins.

References

External links

1994 births
Living people
People from Owings Mills, Maryland
Baseball players from Maryland
Major League Baseball outfielders
Minnesota Twins players
San Francisco Giants players
Maryland Terrapins baseball players
Brewster Whitecaps players
Elizabethton Twins players
Cedar Rapids Kernels players
Fort Myers Miracle players
Chattanooga Lookouts players
Rochester Red Wings players
Surprise Saguaros players